The 1968 Monaco Grand Prix was a Formula One motor race held at the Monte Carlo Circuit on 26 May 1968. It was race 3 of 12 in both the 1968 World Championship of Drivers and the 1968 International Cup for Formula One Manufacturers. The race was won by Lotus driver Graham Hill, who started from pole position. Richard Attwood, driving for BRM, gained second place and fastest lap, while Lucien Bianchi finished in third position in a Cooper, in what was to be these two drivers' only podium finishes.

Report

Background 
Following the fatal accident of Lorenzo Bandini a year earlier, the track was altered with the harbour chicane being tightened and the race shortened by 20 laps. Ferrari still chose not to attend the race since they felt the safety measures to be insufficient. While Graham Hill stated Lotus were still "in despair" over the losses of Jim Clark and Mike Spence, the team nevertheless introduced their new Lotus 49B for the race. This race was the first race where wings were used on an F1 car since the B specifications introduced a wedge shape and a front wing. 1968 would prove to be the season in which wings became a common place on Formula One cars. Jackie Stewart was still sidelined by his wrist injury and was replaced by Johnny Servoz-Gavin, after Ferrari refused to allow Chris Amon to enter for the Matra International team.

Richard Attwood was promoted from Reg Parnell Racing to the BRM works team after Mike Spence's replacement, Chris Irwin, suffered career-ending head injuries at the 1000km Nürburgring endurance race. Brian Redman, who had produced a solid performance in the previous race by finishing third, was racing at the 1000 km Spa and was therefore replaced at Cooper by Lucien Bianchi. With the Indianapolis 500 taking place just five days after the grand prix, McLaren's Denny Hulme was busy flying back and forth to attend both the Monaco Grand Prix as well as qualifying at Indianapolis.

With France in political unrest, the race organizers borrowed power generators from a local film production company in order to ensure that the tunnel would stay illuminated even in case of a power outage.

The race length was reduced from the traditional 100 laps / 315 km to 80 laps / 250 km, which has continued to do so as of 2017.

Qualifying 
During qualifying, Graham Hill, a previous three time-winner at Monaco, set the pace and secured pole position 0.6 seconds ahead of the strong Johnny Servoz-Gavin. The Frenchman proved once more the Matra MS10, which had recorded the fastest lap for Jean-Pierre Beltoise in Spain, was highly competitive.

Race 
Johnny Servoz-Gavin took the lead from Hill at the start, while Bruce McLaren took out the other Lotus of Jackie Oliver at the chicane on the first lap. Servoz-Gavin was struck by bad luck on lap 3 when he suffered a drive shaft failure and crashed. This set the tone for the rest of the race, when after a series of accidents and mechanical failures, only five cars finished the race, with everyone from 3rd-place finishing at least four laps down on eventual winner Hill, who cemented his reputation as "Mr. Monaco" by taking his fourth win in the principality. It was however a close finish, with BRM replacement Richard Attwood surprising by finishing just 2 seconds behind the Englishman. Even though Hill broke the Monaco lap record three times during the race, it was Attwood who ultimately recorded fastest lap, the only one of his career. This would also be his one and only podium finish at a Formula One race, just as for Belgian Lucien Bianchi, who finished third.

Disaster would strike Formula One again just two weeks later as fourth-placed Ludovico Scarfiotti was killed during the Rossfeld hillclimb event.

Classification

Qualifying

Race

Championship standings after the race

Drivers' Championship standings

Constructors' Championship standings

 Note: Only the top five positions are included for both sets of standings.

References

Further reading
 

Monaco Grand Prix
Monaco Grand Prix
Grand Prix